Caliento is a small, unorganized community in southeastern Manitoba in the Rural Municipality of Stuartburn, situated between the communities of Vita, Zhoda, and Sundown.

A post office was opened there  on section 14-2-8E; Safron Stefiuk was the first postmaster. The origin of the name is not certain.

References 

 Geographical Names of Manitoba - Caliento (page 40) - the Millennium Bureau of Canada

Unincorporated communities in Eastman Region, Manitoba